Michael Bronstein  (b. 1980) is an Israeli computer scientist, entrepreneur, and investor. He is a professor at the University of Oxford and Head of Graph Learning Research at Twitter.

Biography 

Bronstein received his PhD from the Technion in 2007. Since 2010, he has been a professor at University of Lugano, Switzerland, affiliated with the Institute of Computational Science and IDSIA. Between 2018 and 2021, he held the Chair in Machine Learning and Pattern Recognition in the Department of Computing, Imperial College London. In 2022, he joined the Department of Computer Science at the University of Oxford as the DeepMind Professor of Artificial Intelligence.

Bronstein has held visiting appointments at Stanford University between 2009 and 2010, and at Harvard University and MIT between 2017 and 2018. He has been affiliated with the Radcliffe Institute for Advanced Study at Harvard University (as a Radcliffe fellow, 2017-2018), the Institute for Advanced Study at Technical University of Munich (as Rudolf Diesel industrial fellow, 2017-2019) and the Institute for Advanced Study in Princeton (as visitor, 2020). 

Bronstein was a co-founder of the Israeli startup Invision, developing a coded-light 3D range sensor. The company was acquired by Intel in 2012 and has become the foundation of Intel RealSense technology. Bronstein served as Principal Engineer at Intel between 2012 and 2019, playing a leading role in the development of RealSense. 

In 2018, Bronstein founded Fabula AI, a London-based startup aiming to solve the problem of online disinformation by looking at how it spreads on social networks. The company was acquired by Twitter in 2019.

Work 

Bronstein's research interests are broadly in theoretical and computational geometric methods for data analysis. His research encompasses a spectrum of applications ranging from machine learning, computer vision, and pattern recognition to geometry processing, computer graphics, and imaging. He is mainly known for his research on deformable 3D shape analysis and "geometric deep learning" (a term he coined), generalizing neural network architectures to manifolds and graphs.

Public appearances 

 ICLR 2021 keynote talk
 TEDx Lugano 2019 (with Kirill Veselkov) 
 World Economic Forum 2015.

Awards 

 Silver Medal of the Royal Academy of Engineering, 2020
 Fellow of the British Computer Society
 Member of the Academia Europaea, 2020
 IEEE Fellow, 2019
 Prix de la Fondation Dalle Molle, 2018
 Royal Society Wolfson Research Merit Award, 2018
 IAPR Fellow, 2018
 ACM Distinguished Speaker, 2015
 World Economic Forum Young Scientist, 2014
 Hershel Rich Technion Innovation Award, 2003

Bronstein is also the recipient of five ERC grants, two Google Faculty Research awards, and two Amazon AWS ML Research grants.

Personal life 

Bronstein is married with two children and currently resides in London. He is the identical twin brother of Alex Bronstein.

Publications 

 "Numerical Geometry of Non-Rigid Shapes" (with Alex Bronstein and Ron Kimmel), Springer 2008.
 "Geometric deep learning: going beyond Euclidean data" (with Yann Lecun, Joan Bruna, Arthur Szlam and Pierre Vandergheynst), IEEE Signal Processing Magazine 2017.

References

External links 
 Michael Bronstein's homepage at Imperial College

Living people
Israeli computer scientists
Computer vision researchers
Technion – Israel Institute of Technology alumni
Fellow Members of the IEEE
Fellows of the Institution of Engineering and Technology
Members of Academia Europaea
Academics of Imperial College London
Artificial intelligence researchers
Academics of the Department of Computing, Imperial College London
1980 births